The Openwall Project is a source for various software, including Openwall GNU/*/Linux (Owl), a security-enhanced Linux distribution designed for servers.  Openwall patches and security extensions have been included into many major Linux distributions.

As the name implies, Openwall GNU/*/Linux draws source code and design concepts from numerous sources, most importantly to the project is its usage of the Linux kernel and parts of the GNU userland, others include the BSDs, such as OpenBSD for its OpenSSH suite and the inspiration behind its own Blowfish-based crypt for password hashing, compatible with the OpenBSD implementation.

Public domain software 
The Openwall project maintains also a list of algorithms and source code which is public domain software.

Openwall GNU/*/Linux releases 

LWN.net reviewed Openwall Linux 3.0. They wrote:

PoC||GTFO  

Issues of the International Journal of Proof-of-Concept or Get The Fuck Out (PoC||GTFO) are mirrored by the Openwall Project under a samizdat licence. The first issue #00 was published in 2013, issue #02 featured the Chaos Computer Club. Issue #07 in 2015 was a homage for Dr. Dobb's Journal, which could be rendered as .pdf, .zip, .bpg, or .html.

See also 

Executable space protection
Comparison of Linux distributions
Security-focused operating system
John the Ripper

References

External links 

 
 

Free software projects
Operating system security
Public-domain software with source code